Climbié may refer to:
Climbié, a book by Bernard Binlin Dadié
Victoria Climbié, a girl whose murder produced major changes in child protection policies in England